Shriya is a feminine given name.  Notable people with the name include:

 Shriya Pilgaonkar
 Shriya Saran, Indian actress and model
 Shriya Sharma, Indian film actress and model
 Shriya Shah-Klorfine
 Shriya Kishore
 Shriya Jha

See also

Feminine given names